Elliman is a surname. Notable people with the name include:

Dave Elliman (1902–1995), Australian rules footballer
Louis Elliman (1906–1965), Irish impresario and theatre manager
Paul Elliman (born 1961), British artist and designer
Yvonne Elliman (born 1951), American singer

See also
Douglas Elliman, largest brokerage in the New York Metropolitan area
Yvonne Elliman (album), debut album by American pop music star Yvonne Elliman